Harald Ehrig (born 6 November 1949 in Zwickau, Saxony) is an East German former luger who competed from the mid-1960s to the early 1970s. He won the silver medal in the men's singles event at the 1972 Winter Olympics in Sapporo.

Ehrig won two bronze medals in the men's singles event at the FIL World Luge Championships (1973, 1975). He also won two medals in the men's singles event at the FIL European Luge Championships with a gold in 1970 and a silver in 1972.

References

List of European luge champions 

1949 births
Living people
German male lugers
Lugers at the 1972 Winter Olympics
Olympic silver medalists for East Germany
Olympic lugers of East Germany
Olympic medalists in luge
Medalists at the 1972 Winter Olympics
People from Zwickau
Sportspeople from Saxony
20th-century German people